Post-production is part of the process of filmmaking, video production, audio production, and photography. Post-production includes all stages of production occurring after principal photography or recording individual program segments. 

The first part of the post-production process is the traditional non-linear (analog) film editing at the outset of post-production has mostly been replaced by digital or video editing software that operates as a non-linear editing (NLE) system. The advantage of being able to have this non-linear capacity is in the flexibility for editing scenes out of order, making creative changes at will, carefully shaping the film in a thoughtful, meaningful way for emotional effect.
Once the production team is satisfied with the picture editing, the picture editing is said to be "locked."  At this point begins the turnover process, where the picture is prepared for lab and color finishing and the sound is "spotted" and turnover to the composer and sound designers for sound design, composing and sound mixing.

Processes

Post-production consists of many different processes grouped under one name. These typically include:
 When content is shot on film it is typically transferred to video, DPX, OpenEXR with a telecine or a more modern motion picture film scanner.
Editing the content of the film or dramatic television program.
 Writing, recording and re-recording, and editing the soundtrack.
 Adding visual effects – mainly computer-generated imagery (CGI) which is then composited into the frame.
 Sound design, sound effects, ADR, foley, and music, culminating in a process known as sound re-recording or mixing with professional audio equipment.
Stereoscopic 3D conversion in the case of content that was shot in 2D which is scheduled to have a 3D release
Color grading (and color correction) in a color suite.
Subtitling, closed captioning, or dubbing.

The post-production phase of creating a film usually takes longer than the actual shooting of the film and can take several months to complete because it includes the complete editing, color correction, and the addition of music and sound. The process of editing a movie is also seen as the second directing because through post-production it is possible to change the intention of the movie. Furthermore, through the use of color grading tools and the addition of music and sound, the atmosphere of the movie can be heavily influenced. For instance, a blue-tinted movie is associated with a cold atmosphere and the choice of music and sound increases the effect of the shown scenes to the audience.

Television
In television, the phases of post-production include: editing, video editing, color grading, sound editing, animation and visual effects insertions, viewing and the start of the airing process.

Photography

Professional post-producers usually apply a certain range of image editing operations to the raw image format provided by a photographer or an image-bank. There is a range of proprietary and free and open-source software, running on a range of operating systems available to do this work.

The first of post-production usually requires loading the raw images into the post-production software. If there is more than one image, and they belong to a set, ideally post-producers try to equalize the images before loading them. After that, if necessary, the next step would be to cut the objects in the images with the Pen Tool for a perfect and clean cut. The next stage would be cleaning the image using tools such as the healing tool, clone tool, and patch tool.

The next stages depend on what the client ordered. If it's a photo-montage, the post-producers would usually start assembling the different images into the final document, and start to integrate the images with the background.

In advertising, it usually requires assembling several images together in a photo-composition.

Types of work usually done:
 Advertising that requires one background (as one or more images to assemble) and one or more models. (Usually, the most time-consuming, as often these are image bank images which don't have much quality, and they all have different light and color as they were not controlled by only one photographer in one set location)
 Product-photography that usually requires several images of the same object with different lights, and assembled together, to control light and unwanted reflections, or to assemble parts that would be difficult to get in one shot, such as a beer glass for a beer advertising. (Sometimes to composite one image of a beer glass it requires four or five images: one for the base, one for the beer, one for the label, one for the foam, and one or more for splashing beer if that is desired)
 Fashion photography that usually requires a really heavy post-production for editorial or advertising

Music
Techniques used in music post-production include  (compiling the best portions of multiple takes into one superior take), timing and pitch correction (perhaps through beat quantization), and adding effects. This process is typically referred to as mixing and can also involve equalization and adjusting the levels of each individual track to provide an optimal sound experience. Contrary to the name, post-production may occur at any point during the recording and production process.

See also

 2-pop
 Audio editing
 Cinematic techniques
 Color suite
 Direct to disk recording
 DTE (direct to edit)
 Dubbing (filmmaking)
 Film editing
 Film score
 Linear video editing
 Negative cutting
 Non-destructive editing
 Non-linear editing system (NLE)
 Offline editing
 Outline of film
 Pre-production
 Sound effect
 Special effect
 Stock footage
 Tapeless production
 Tapeless camcorder
 Video editing
 Video editing software
 Video server

References

Film and video technology
Filmmaking
Film production
Cinematic techniques